Ribchester Almshouse is a building on Stydd Lane in the English manor of Stydd, near Ribchester, Lancashire. It dates to 1728 and is a Grade II* listed building. It stands in a small garth adjoining the priest's garden.

The almshouses are in two storeys and five bays with a stone-slate roof.  The middle three bays are in sandstone and the outer bays are in brick.  There is a central flight of 16 steps leading to a first floor arcade with three semicircular arches carried on unfluted Doric columns and half-columns.  Above this is a truncated shaped gable, surmounted by a cornice.  The outer bays contain sash windows. Originally, at least, the interior consisted of six sets of rooms, each containing a sitting room, bedroom and pantry, on two floors.Parliamentary Papers, Volume 79 (1908), p. 336

The building was constructed under the terms of the will of local landowner John Shireburn (d. 1726), who wanted built "a good almshouse on his estate at Stydd for five poor persons to live separately therein".

In 1990, the building was restored and converted into four flats, administered by the Eaves Brook Housing Association, part of the Manchester and District Housing Association.

References

Sources

See also
Listed buildings in Ribchester

External links
View from the road – Google Street View, May 2011

Grade II* listed buildings in Lancashire
Buildings and structures in Ribchester
1728 establishments in England